Free Your Soul...and Save My Mind is the tenth studio album by crossover thrash band Suicidal Tendencies, released in 2000.

A music video was made for "Pop Songs". It was the band's first official video in six years, since "Love Vs. Loneliness" (from Suicidal for Life).

This album marked the only time Suicidal Tendencies did not make any personnel changes over three consecutive studio recordings, as the lineup of Mike Muir, Mike Clark, Dean Pleasants, Josh Paul and Brooks Wackerman had recorded their previous album Freedumb and their 1998 EP Six the Hard Way. Paul and Wackerman did, however, leave the band after the 2001 release of their split album Friends & Family, Vol. 2.

Reception

Track listing
 All tracks written by Mike Muir and Mike Clark, unless stated

Credits
Mike Muir – vocals
Mike Clark – guitar
Dean Pleasants – guitar
Josh Paul – bass
Brooks Wackerman – drums
Herman Jackson – Moog bass on "Got Mutation"
Produced by Suicidal Tendencies
Recorded at Titan Studios, except tracks 5 and 7, recorded at Stall #2
Engineered by Michael Vail Blum, except tracks 5 and 7, engineered by Darien Rundall
Mixed by Paul Northfield at Skip Saylor, except tracks 5, 7, 9, and 10 mixed by Mike Blum and Suicidal Tendencies
Mastered by Brian Gardner at Bernie Grundman Mastering Studios
Artwork by Adam Siegel

External links
Suicidal Tendencies official website

Suicidal Tendencies albums
Suicidal Records albums
2000 albums